Alicia P. Magos is an anthropologist and a professor emerita of University of the Philippines Visayas. She had extensive and published works on the culture of Western Visayas especially on the Panay Bukidnon. She was a UNESCO International Literary Research Awardee and 1999 Metrobank Ten Outstanding Teacher.

Education
She received her M.A in Anthropology from University of the Philippines Diliman in 1978 and later her Doctor of Philosophy in Philippine Studies in 1986 from the same university.

Works on Sugidanon
Magos started her work on the Sugidanon (to tell), the epics of Panay in 1992 through a grant from the French government. She first recorded two epics from a shaman chanter named Anggoran (Christian name Preciosa “Susa” Caballero). In 1994, she further studied the extent of epic dissemination in Central Panay and discovered a total of 10 epics. The epics are the following:
Tikun Kadlom, Amburukay, Derikaryong Pada, Balanakon, Kalampay, Pahagunong, Sinagnayan, Humadapnon sa Tarangban, Nagburuhisan, and Alayaw.

Works on binukot
Magos first inquired into the phenomenon of the binukot from a socio-political perspective when she studied extensively the ma-aram (Babaylan) tradition in Antique.

Published works

References

20th-century Filipino historians
Filipino anthropologists
Filipino women scientists
Filipino women anthropologists
20th-century women scientists
21st-century women scientists
Living people
People from Iloilo
University of the Philippines Diliman alumni
Visayan people
Filipino women historians
Year of birth missing (living people)